The J-B Weld Company is an international company that produces epoxy products. The home office is based in Sulphur Springs, Texas. J-B Weld (stylized as J-B WELD)  is the name of their flagship product: a specialized, high-temperature epoxy adhesive for use in bonding materials together. The company has run advertisements showing engine block repair with J-B Weld.

History
The company had its beginnings in 1969 in Sulphur Springs, Texas. Sam Bonham, at the time running a machine shop, discovered a way to create what he called a "tougher than steel" epoxy.  In 1968, Sam's future wife Mary persuaded him to sell his invention and he founded the J-B Weld Company.  Sam died suddenly in 1989.  He had commented before his death, "My life's dream is for J-B Weld to be all the way around the world, and for me to see an 18-wheeler load out of here with nothing but J-B Weld."  Within a year of his death, Mary had opened a European hub in London, internationalizing the J-B Weld Company and the distribution of the product.

Initially, the company sold to automotive shops and jobbers in Texas. Now, the J-B Weld Company distributes its products through multiple retail channels - including automotive chains, home improvement centers, hardware stores, and farm stores  - and does business in all states in the United States, as well as in 27 other countries.  In 2008 the company was purchased by a group of private investors.  Led by CEO Chip Hanson, they have expanded the product lines through innovation.

Products
The J-B Weld Company's original product line focused on a small number of products: J-B Weld (original 2-tube epoxy),  (4-hour epoxy),  (epoxy putty), Waterweld (underwater adhesive/filler), and a few others.

Since 2008, the company has broadened the product line to add J-B SteelStik, KwikWood, PlasticWeld, MarineWeld, Perm-O-Seal, WoodWeld and ClearWeld.

J-B Weld epoxy
J-B Weld is a two-part epoxy adhesive (or filler) that can withstand high-temperature environments.
J-B Weld can be used to bond surfaces made from metal, porcelain, ceramic, glass, marble, PVC, ABS, concrete, fiberglass, wood, fabric, or paper.  Alcohol should be avoided when cleaning surfaces, as it can degrade the bond.
J-B Weld is water-resistant, petroleum/chemical-resistant (when hardened), and acid-resistant. It also resists shock, vibration, and extreme temperature fluctuations. J-B Weld can also be used inside a microwave oven, exposed to microwave radiation instead of infrared radiation (heat).

The product is contained in 2 separate tubes: the "steel" (black tube of resin) and the "hardener" (red tube). Equal amounts are squeezed from both tubes and mixed. For the best bond, surfaces should be roughened (or scratched) with fine or coarse sandpaper.

When first mixed, J-B Weld is subject to sagging or running (slow dripping); even more so at warmer temperatures. After about 20 minutes the mixture begins to thicken into a putty that can be shaped with a putty knife or wooden spatula.
The mixture will set enough for the glued parts to be handled within 4–6 hours, but requires up to 15 hours at cool temperatures to fully cure and harden. Temperatures above  shorten all these times.
After the initial setting period of a few hours, heat (e.g. from a heat lamp or incandescent light bulb placed near the bond) will speed the curing time.

J-B Weld can be used as an adhesive, laminate, plug, filler, sealant, or electrical insulator. When fully cured, J-B Weld can be drilled, formed, ground, tapped, machined, sanded, and painted.

While J-B Weld Original epoxy dries to a dark grey color, J-B Weld's ClearWeld epoxy dries clear.   Although its bond is not quite as strong as the Original's (3900 psi vs. 5020 psi), ClearWeld is often preferred when appearance is an important consideration.

J-B Kwik epoxy
J-B Kwik (stylized as J-B KWIK) is a two-part epoxy, intended as an adhesive or filler, that can withstand medium-temperature environments (up to ).

J-B Kwik cures much more quickly, but it is not as strong or as heat-resistant as the original J-B Weld.  However, J-B Kwik has the same adhesion as J-B Weld, and also does not shrink when hardening.

J-B Kwik can be used to bond surfaces made from any combination of iron, steel, copper, aluminum, brass, bronze, pewter, plus porcelain, wood, ceramic, glass, marble, PVC, ABS, concrete, fiberglass, fabric, or paper.  J-B Kwik is waterproof, petroleum/chemical-resistant (when cured), acid-resistant; plus resists shock, vibration, and extreme temperature fluctuations.

See also
 Araldite

References

External links

Adhesives
Privately held companies based in Texas
Polymers
American brands